The Pineto Regional Park is a protected natural area of Lazio, Italy, instituted in 1987. It has an area of approximately 240 hectares, which includes Pineta Sacchetti. The park is in the northwest area of the city of Rome, in Municipio XIX, shared between the districts of Aurelio, Primavalle, and Trionfale.

The Parco del Pineto is a valley, the so-called “Valle dell’Inferno” (Valley of Hell), once extending to the Vatican walls and characterized by furnaces and limestone for the construction of St. Peter’s Basilica.

The cork oak, maple and birch trees are predominant here. Among the wildlife there are dormice and water-snakes. The park also contains traces of a previous ecological structure.

See also
 Regional Park of Decima-Malafede

References

External links

Roma Natura
Agrinet

Parks in Rome
Regional parks of Italy
Protected areas established in 1987
Rome Q. XIII Aurelio
Rome Q. XIV Trionfale
Rome Q. XXVII Primavalle